Marcus Christopher Crawford (born September 30, 1992) is an American professional basketball player who plays for AS Douanes of the Basketball Africa League (BAL). He played college basketball for the University of Memphis.

College career
Crawford played four years of college basketball for the Memphis Tigers. After two irregular initial seasons, he had a breakout season as a junior in 2012–13, posting career highs in points, rebounds, three-point field goals made (71), and three-point percentage (39.9), and earning Conference USA Sixth Man of the Year honors.

Professional career
After going undrafted in the 2014 NBA draft, Crawford joined the Houston Rockets for the 2014 NBA Summer League. On September 28, 2014, he signed with the Cleveland Cavaliers. However, he was later waived by the Cavaliers on October 19 after appearing in five preseason games. On November 2, he was acquired by the Canton Charge of the NBA Development League as an affiliate player of the Cavaliers. In his rookie season, Crawford helped the Charge record a franchise-best 31 wins. He went on to help his team win their first round playoff match-up against the Sioux Falls Skyforce 2–1, making it through to the semi-finals where they lost to the Fort Wayne Mad Ants 2–0. In 54 games for the Charge in 2014–15, Crawford averaged 8.8 points, 3.9 rebounds, 3.4 assists and 1.0 steals per game.

On July 28, 2015, Crawford signed with SPO Rouen Basket of France for the 2015–16 LNB Pro A season. On January 4, 2016, he was released by Rouen. In 14 games for the club, he averaged 5.5 points, 2.1 rebounds and 1.9 assists per game.

On February 24, 2016, Crawford was reacquired by the Canton Charge. He made his season debut that night in a 119–109 win over the Grand Rapids Drive, recording 11 points, two rebounds and nine assists in 26 minutes.

On September 23, 2016, Crawford signed with the Memphis Grizzlies. However, he was later waived by the Grizzlies on October 20 after appearing in four preseason games. On November 1, he was reacquired by the Canton Charge. Ten days later, he was waived by the Canton Charge. On November 28, he was acquired by the Iowa Energy, but was waived on December 12 after averaging 7.3 points, 1.0 rebounds and 3.7 assists in three games.

During summer 2017, Crawford signed a one-year deal with Beirut Club of the Lebanese Basketball League. During that season he led his team to the league's Final 4. He averaged 18.6 points, 7.3 rebounds, and 6.3 assists per game. On August 29, 2018, Crawford signed another one-year deal with Beirut Club.

In January 2020, Crawford signed in Tunisia with US Monastir of the Basketball Africa League (BAL). However, the season was cancelled shortly after his signing due to the COVID-19 pandemic outbreak. Later, he joined Club Africain in Tunisia instead. On March 21, 2021, he signed with Ezzahra Sports.

In March 2022, Crawford joined the Guinean club SLAC before the 2022 season of the BAL. On March 5, he scored 30 points in a 70–85 opening night win against DUC. He helped SLAC advance to the playoffs after leading the team in both points and assist with 21.4 points and 4.8 assists per game.

On May 17, 2022, Crawford joined Al Wahda Damascus of the Syrian Basketball League.

On August 23, 2022, he joined Patriots BBC of the Rwanda Basketball League ahead of the playoffs. On August 26, Crawford scored 8 points in his debut in a 91–45 win against Tigers BBC. The Patriots ended up losing the league finals to REG, therefore finishing second.

In January 2023, Crawford signed with Senegalese champions AS Douanes with whom he played in his third consecutive BAL season.

The Basketball Tournament
Chris Crawford played for Team Memphis State in the 2018 edition of The Basketball Tournament. He averaged 10.0 points per game, 5.0 assists per game and 4.5 rebounds per game. Team Memphis State reached the second round before falling to Team DRC.

BAL career statistics

|-
|style="text-align:left;"|2021
|style="text-align:left;"|Monastir
| 6 || 0 || 24.1 || .478 || .410 || .500 || 3.0 || 3.7 || 1.3 || .2 || 14.0
|-
|style="text-align:left;"|2022
|style="text-align:left;"|SLAC
| 5 || 5 ||36.0 || .438 || .412 || .889 || 6.4 || 4.0 || 1.2 || .2 || 21.4

References

External links
 Chris Crawford at lnb.fr
 Chris Crawford at nbadleague.com
 Chris Crawford at gotigersgo.com

1992 births
Club Africain basketball players
Ezzahra Sports players
Living people
African-American basketball players
American expatriate basketball people in France
American expatriate basketball people in Lebanon
Basketball players from Memphis, Tennessee
Beirut Club players
Canton Charge players
Iowa Energy players
SLAC basketball players
Memphis Tigers men's basketball players
Shooting guards
American men's basketball players
US Monastir basketball players
21st-century African-American sportspeople
Al Wahda men's basketball players
Patriots BBC players
AS Douanes basketball players